Woman's World  is an American supermarket weekly magazine.

Woman's World, or variants, may also refer to:

Books and magazines
 Woman's World (novel), a 2005 novel by Graham Rawle
 The Woman's World, a London magazine published 1887–1890 and edited by Oscar Wilde
 Women's World (Iranian magazine), published 1822–1823
 Women's World (Ottoman magazine), published 1913–1921
 Women's World (Serbian magazine), published 1886–1914

Film and television
 Woman's World (1954 film), American film
 Woman's World (1967 film), Soviet film
 Woman's World (TV program), a cooking show on WKRG-TV
 Women's World (TV series), also known as Woman's World, an Australian television series

Music
 "Woman's World" (song), a 2013 Cher single (also lead track on Closer to the Truth)
 "Woman's World", a 1980 pop single by The Jags
 "Woman's World", a 1981 song by Squeeze on East Side Story
 "Woman's World", a 2010 single by Selah, featuring Mz. Bratt and Sadie Ama
 "Woman's World", a 2018 song on LM5 (Deluxe) by Little Mix
 "Woman's World (Gurlz Stand Up)", a song by Shystie on Diamond in the Dirt

Retail businesses
 Woman's World, a chain of Minnesota clothing stores owned by Gamble-Skogmo

See also
 Ladies' Edition, Woman's World, a 1997 album by the American R&B band H-Town